José María Calatrava y Peinado (26 February 1781 in Mérida, Spain – 16 January 1846 in Madrid) was a Spanish politician who served as the Prime Minister of Spain and Minister of State between 1836 and 1837.

The main action of Calatrava's administration was proclaiming the constitution of 1837 which granted freedom of religion in Spain while still requiring the state to support the Roman Catholic Church. This was too drastic a change for many in Spain and it caused the downfall of Calatrava's government.

He finished his career as President of the Supreme Court of Spain (1840–1843).

References
Congress of Deputies. José María Calatrava Peinado

|-

|-

Prime Ministers of Spain
Foreign ministers of Spain
1781 births
1846 deaths
Progressive Party (Spain) politicians
Presidents of the Supreme Court of Spain
Presidents of the Congress of Deputies (Spain)